= Central Airmen Selection Board =

Central Airmen Selection Board was formed as a selection board for Indian Air Force (IAF) at the New Delhi Air Force Station (AFND) and was entrusted with organising recruitment rallies, conduct tests and design standard selection policies and procedures for inducting personnel below officer ranks in various trades of the Indian Air Force.

== History and objective ==
Central Airmen Selection Board was formed at Air Force Station New Delhi (AFND) in May 1980 under the direct control of Air HQs. In 1996, it moved from AFND to Brar Square, Naraina. Central Airmen Selection Board is commanded by an Air Commodore who is designated as President CASB.

It's a board entrusted with conducting recruitment rallies through tests and designing uniform selection processes for the enrollment of Airmen, Agniveer Vayu and Non Combatants in the Indian Air Force (IAF).

Central Airmen Selection Board conducts the written exam and physical test across India.

== Types of examinations ==
Following are the different levels of exam conducted by board for recruiting Air Warriors (Airmen, Agniveer Vayu and NCs) into Technical and Non Technical streams of Indian Air Force.

- Written Exam.
- Phase II and physical tests at different Airmen Selection Centres.

== Airmen Selection Centres ==
Central Airmen Selection Board has branches in following cities where selected candidates of written exam and requested to report to complete other formalities.

- 1 ASC - Ambala Cantt
- 2 ASC - Race Course (New Delhi)
- 3 ASC - Chakeri (Kanpur)
- 4 ASC - 24 Parganas, North (Barrackpore)
- 5 ASC - Jodhpur
- 6 ASC - Santacruz East (Mumbai)
- 7 ASC - Cubbon Road (Bengaluru)
- 8 ASC - Tambaram (Chennai)
- 9 ASC - Baramunda (Bhubaneswar)
- 10 ASC - Bihta (Patna)
- 11 ASC - Borjhar (Guwahati)
- 12 ASC - Bowenpally (Secundrabad)
- 14 ASC - Kochi
- 15 ASC - Bhopal

== See also ==
- Indian Air Force
